Penllyn is a village and community in the Vale of Glamorgan, Wales. It is located north west of the market town of Cowbridge. As a community it contains the settlements of Llansannor, Pentre Meryrick, Trerhingyll, Ystradowen and Penllyn itself.

Penllyn is home to Penllyn Castle, a 12th-century fortification which, although ruinous, is now adjoined by a castellated mansion originally built in the late 16th century.

Notes

Villages in the Vale of Glamorgan
Communities in the Vale of Glamorgan